Chan Chi Ming (born 28 May 1964) is a Hong Kong table tennis player. He competed in the men's doubles event at the 1988 Summer Olympics.

References

External links
 

1964 births
Living people
Hong Kong male table tennis players
Olympic table tennis players of Hong Kong
Table tennis players at the 1988 Summer Olympics
Place of birth missing (living people)